Arunachaleswarar Temple is a Hindu temple located on the Walajabad-Chengalpattu highway in Tamil Nadu, India. The presiding deity is Shiva. There are also shrines to Ganapati, Durga and Dakshinamoorthy.

References 
 

Hindu temples in Kanchipuram district
Shiva temples in Kanchipuram district